Akar is a Turkish surname. Notable people with the surname include:

 Furkan Akar (born 2002), Turkish short track speed skater
 Hulusi Akar (born 1952), Turkish Army general
 Meltem Akar (born 1982), Turkish female boxer
 Nasuh Akar (1925–1984), Turkish sports wrestler
 Rıdvan Akar (born 1961), Turkish journalist and author
 Zeina Akar (born ), Lebanese politician
 Zeki Akar (born 1944), Turkish judge

Turkish-language surnames